Trichognoma chinensis is a species of beetle in the family Cerambycidae, and the only species in the genus Trichognoma. It was described by Breuning in 1956.

References

Lebiinae
Beetles described in 1956
Taxa named by Stephan von Breuning (entomologist)